The Canon EOS C100 Mark II is the 5th digital cinema camera in the Cinema EOS range, announced on October 22, 2014. The camera has been available as of December 2014.

Canon EOS cameras